André Jean Mabboux (6 November 1923 – 17 November 2011) was a French curler.

Teams

References

External links
 

2011 deaths
1923 births
French male curlers